Serpente was one of seven s built for the  (Royal Italian Navy) during the early 1930s.

Design and description
The Argonauta class was derived from the earlier s. They displaced  surfaced and  submerged. Their crew numbered 44 officers and enlisted men.

For surface running, the boats were powered by two  diesel engines, each driving one propeller shaft. When submerged each propeller was driven by a  electric motor. They could reach  on the surface and  underwater.

The boats were armed with six  torpedo tubes, four in the bow and two in the stern for which they carried a total of 12 torpedoes. They were also armed with a single  deck gun forward of the conning tower for combat on the surface. Their anti-aircraft armament consisted of two single  machine guns.

Construction and career
Serpente was laid down by Cantieri navali Tosi di Taranto at their Taranto shipyard in 1930, launched on 28 February 1932 and completed the following year.

Notes

References

External links
 Sommergibili Marina Militare website

Argonauta-class submarines
World War II submarines of Italy
1932 ships
Ships built by Cantieri navali Tosi di Taranto
Ships built in Taranto